Patrick James Carney (born April 15, 1980) is an American musician and producer best known as the drummer of the Black Keys, a blues rock band from Akron, Ohio.

Early life
Carney's father, Jim, is a retired reporter for the Akron Beacon Journal and a music lover whom Carney credits with introducing him to various genres.
His mother, Mary Stormer, is the traffic and parking supervisor for the Akron Municipal Clerk of Courts and is a former member of the Akron Board of Education. 
Carney has three brothers, William, who is an Amtrak supervisor; Michael, a graphic artist who created the art for each of the Black Keys' albums until he handed over the reigns for Dropout Boogie; and Barry Stormer Jr., who is an investment banker.
 
Carney's uncle, Ralph Carney, was a professional saxophone player, and played with Tom Waits, Marc Ribot and the B-52's among others.

After Carney's parents divorced when he was 6, he lived part of the time with his mother, Mary Stormer, and part of the time with his father, Jim Carney, who had moved to a neighborhood in West Akron (Ohio) not far from the home in which he and Mary lived. Dan Auerbach lived around the block in this new neighborhood, and Patrick and Dan met and played tag football with Auerbach's friends, although Patrick and Auerbach did not become friends until high school.

Carney stated in an interview with Modern Drummer that he never took drum lessons as a kid, but learned by mimicking friends that were also drummers, using a $150 drumset that he bought with money earned from a job as a teenager.

Music career

In 2001, Carney and Auerbach, lead singer and guitarist, formed the Black Keys, releasing their debut album The Big Come Up less than a year later. This was followed by Thickfreakness in 2003 and Rubber Factory in 2004. The band's fourth album Magic Potion was released in 2006. Attack & Release, their critically acclaimed fifth album was released in 2008, with a follow up in 2010 titled Brothers. The band released the albums El Camino in 2011, Turn Blue in 2014, and Delta Kream in 2021. The band's latest album is Dropout Boogie, released in 2022.

Music Producer
Carney currently produces and writes music out of his Nashville, Tennessee-based recording studio, Audio Eagle. He has produced a range of artists from various musical backgrounds including the Black Keys, Michelle Branch, Calvin Johnson, Tennis, the Sheepdogs, Beaten Awake, Houseguest, Churchbuilder, Jessy Wilson, Kramies and *repeat repeat.

Audio Eagle Studio
Audio Eagle Studio is a recording studio opened in 2001 by Carney. The studio was located in Akron, Ohio and consisted mostly of a digital 12-track recorder. It went through many incarnations and configurations and was mainly used to record the first four Black Keys albums. In 2010, the studio was relocated to Nashville, Tennessee.

Serious Boredom on Sirius XMU
Carney hosts a monthly radio show on Sirius XMU called "Serious Boredom with Patrick Carney."

Vice News Tonight

Carney had a segment on HBO's news show, "Vice News Tonight", titled "Patrick Carney's High Standards Music Corner" where he listens to and judges new songs.

Other musical ventures

In 2009, while fellow Black Keys member Dan Auerbach was on his solo tour, Carney formed a new band called Drummer in which he played bass guitar. Each of the band's members had played drums in another band. They released Feel Good Together, their debut album in the same year. Carney is the drummer on the Rentals' 2014 album Lost in Alphaville. 

Carney contributed the main title theme to the 2014 Netflix show BoJack Horseman, and, in 2017, music to its soundtrack.

Views on the music industry 
In a 2019 band interview with Joe Rogan, Patrick expressed his distaste for the trend among record companies generally, and Warner Brothers particularly, to 'bundle' tickets and record sales. The band feels that this practice, along with the record industry's increased emphasis on streaming numbers and social media profiles, disadvantages artists.

Personal life

Carney's first marriage was to writer Denise Grollmus, in 2007, when he lived in Akron, Ohio. The two had dated for several years, since Grollmus was a student at Oberlin College in Ohio and Carney and Dan Auerbach launched the Black Keys. The couple divorced in 2009. Both talked about the messy breakup in the media; Carney in Rolling Stones May 27, 2010, issue and Grollmus in an essay - "Snapshots From a Rock 'N' Roll Marriage", published in Salon on March 3, 2011.

In 2010, Carney and his bandmate, Dan Auerbach, moved from Akron and purchased homes in Nashville. They recorded their El Camino album at Auerbach's newly completed Nashville studio, Easy Eye Sound Studio.

Carney married Emily Ward, whom he had met while living in New York City, on September 15, 2012, in the backyard of their Nashville home. Carney and Ward divorced in January 2016. Ward, a California native, had moved to Los Angeles by that time.

In 2015, Carney met Michelle Branch at a Grammy party, and the two started dating during the production of Branch's album Hopeless Romantic, which Carney produced. In 2017, Branch and her daughter Owen moved into Carney's Nashville home, which they share with Irish wolfhounds. Carney and Branch became engaged on her birthday in 2017. On February 11, 2018, Branch announced that she and Carney were expecting their first child. Their son, Rhys James Carney, was born in August 2018. Carney and Branch married in April 2019. In October 2020, the couple purchased a home in the Old Village neighborhood of Mount Pleasant, SC, across the harbor from downtown Charleston. In December 2020, it was revealed that Branch suffered a miscarriage. In February 2022, Branch gave birth to her third child, a daughter, her second with Carney. On August 11, 2022, Branch announced her separation from Carney, citing his alleged infidelity. She was arrested on a charge of domestic assault due to slapping Carney after accusing him of infidelity. This charge was later dismissed.

Discography

The Black Keys
 The Big Come Up (2002)
 Thickfreakness (2003)
 Rubber Factory (2004)
 Magic Potion (2006)
 Attack & Release (2008)
 Brothers (2010)
 El Camino (2011)
 Turn Blue (2014)
 Let's Rock (2019)
 Delta Kream (2021)
 Dropout Boogie (2022)

Drummer
 Feel Good Together (2009)
The Rentals
 Lost in Alphaville (2014)

Producer
 The Sheepdogs (2012)
 Young & Old (2012)
 Underneath the Rainbow (2014)
 Ritual in Repeat (2014)
 Goon (2015)
 Hopeless Romantic (2017)
 Double Roses (2017)
 A Wonderful Beast (2018)
 Phase (2019)
 Glazed (2019)

References

External links

The Black Keys official website
The Black Keys official Myspace page

1980 births
Living people
American rock drummers
American people of Irish descent
Grammy Award winners
Musicians from Akron, Ohio
University of Akron alumni
American rock bass guitarists
American male bass guitarists
The Black Keys members
The Rentals members
Guitarists from Ohio
21st-century American drummers
21st-century American bass guitarists
21st-century American male musicians